Jaffueliobryum arsenei is a species of moss in the family Ptychomitriaceae.

It is endemic to Querétaro and Zacatecas states in Mexico.

It is an Endangered species, threatened by habitat loss.

References

Bryophyta of North America
Endemic flora of Mexico
Flora of Querétaro
Flora of Zacatecas
Endangered biota of Mexico
Endangered plants
Taxonomy articles created by Polbot
Grimmiales